Sheikh Abdullah Al Muti Sharafuddin (1 January 1930 – 30 November 1998), mostly known as "Abdullah Al Muti" was a Bangladeshi educationalist and science writer. He wrote tough scientific ideas in an easy fashion suitable for children and teenagers. He became first Bangladeshi writer to win the UNESCO Kalingo Prize in 1983. He had earned major national awards - Bangla Academy Literary Award in 1975, Ekushey Padak in 1985 and Independence Day Award in 1995.

Early life
Born in to the Sheikh family of a village in Sirajganj District, Muti was the eldest among five sons and six daughters of Sheikh Moin Sharafuddin and Halima Sharafuddin. In 1945, attending matriculation (presently SSC) from Muslim High School, Dhaka he placed second in Kolkata board. Two years later he passes IA exam (presently HSC) and got admitted in the University of Dhaka. He completed his B.Sc. and M.Sc. in Physics standing first class first in 1952 and 1953 respectively. Then he got a scholarship from US government and went to University of Chicago, Illinois. There he accomplished MA (education) and PhD (education) in 1960 and 1962 respectively.

Career
Muti started his career as a lecturer in physics at the Rajshahi Government College in 1954. He became professor in the same college in 1955. He held the post Director, Education Extension Center, Dhaka from 1965 to 1973. He also assumed office as Education and Culture Councilor at different foreign embassies of Bangladesh, Joint Secretary, Additional Secretary and Secretary at Education and Science Ministry at different times. After his retirement in 1986, he was the chief adviser of Secondary Scientific Education Program financed by ADB and UNDP. Besides he also presented several science related popular programs in radio and television.

Muti started writing on science since his school days. At that time he contributed articles to the Dainik Azad ('Mukuler Mahfil') and Monthly Mohammadi. He was also associated with editing tabloid magazines named 'Mukul' and 'Mukul Fouz'. Besides, he also wrote about prospects of education in the Monthly 'Hullor' and 'Dilruba.

Muti wrote 27 books on science and education. He also translated 10 books from English into Bengali. He was the executive editor of UNESCO Batayan, a quarterly Bengali edition of Unesco Courier from 1982 until his death.

Books
 Eso Bigganer Rajje (1955)
 Obak Prithibi (1955)
 Rohosser Shesh Nei (1969)
 Jana-Ojanar Deshe (1976)
 Sagorer Rohosshopuri (1976)
 Biggan O Manush (1975)
 E Juger Biggan (1981)
 Telivisioner Kotha (1988)
 Swadhinota, Shikhya O Onnano Prosongo
 Abiskarer Neshay (1969)
 Dangai Jole Hawai Chole (1977)

Awards
 Independence Day Award (1995)
 Ekushey Padak (1985)
 Kalinga Award of UNESCO (1983)
 Bangla Academy Literary Award (1975)
 Shishu Academy Award
 Qudrat-i-Khuda Gold Medal

References

1930 births
1998 deaths
University of Dhaka alumni
Bangladeshi male writers
Bengali-language writers
Bangladeshi science fiction writers
Recipients of the Ekushey Padak
Recipients of the Independence Day Award
Recipients of Bangla Academy Award
Place of death missing
Kalinga Prize recipients
Burials at Banani Graveyard